WOXY may refer to:

 WOXY.com, a defunct Internet radio station
 WOXY (FM), a radio station (97.7 FM) licensed to Mason, Ohio, United States